Karempudi is a village in Palnadu district of the Indian state of Andhra Pradesh. It is the headquarters of Karempudi mandal in Gurazala revenue division.

History 

The battle of Palnadu (Palnati Yudham) was immortalized in Telugu literature by the poet Srinatha in his 'Palnati Vira Charita'. The only other scholarly book on the subject was written by Gene Roghair titled "Epic of Palnadu: Study and Translation of Palnati Virula Katha, a Telugu Oral Tradition from Andhra Pradesh". It was a battle between two factions of the Kalachuris (Haihaya).

Geography 

Naguleru stream is the source of water for the village.

Governance 

Karempudi gram panchayat is the local self-government of the village. It is divided into wards and each ward is represented by a ward member.

Education 

As per the school information report for the academic year 2018–19, the village has 18 schools. These include one model, one KGBV, 6 private, 7 Zilla/Mandal Parishad and 3 other types of schools.

References 

Villages in Palnadu district